Yemodish Bekele (born 1960) is a published author of more than seven books, including poetry, short stories, and a novella, and was the first Ethiopian woman to publish her own collection of short stories. A crime journalist, Yemedish was also the first woman to become the head editor for Polis Ena Ermijaw (‘Police and Future Journeys’) the newspaper of the Federal Police in Ethiopia.

An activist for women's rights, she works with and serves on board for organisations devoted to women's advancement. She is currently the president of the Ethiopian Women Writers’ Association, and serves as the chair of the board of the Network of Ethiopian Women's Associations.

Biography 
Yemodish was born in 1960 in the Teklehaiymanot area of Addis Ababa, Ethiopia, where she attended the local primary school Africa Andinet, and attended secondary school in Addis Ketema. Yemodish was an only child, and as the daughter of a police officer she grew up reading police newspapers and publications.

In 1979, at the age of 19, she won a competition sponsored by the Ministry of Culture and Sports.  This led to twelve of her poems being published in an illustrated collection entitled  ‘Abyotawi Gitmoch’ (‘Revolutionary Poems’). One of the poems was entitled ‘‘ke maget eske ketema’  (From the home to the town) and was about the struggle of women.

In 1990, at the age of 27, she published her first book of short stories, titled ‘ ye bakene gize’  (‘Wasted Time’).

Yemedish worked for twenty-six years at Polis Ena Ermijaw the newspaper of the Federal Police in Ethiopia. She started as an intern, and worked her way up as a reporter and crime journalist, and then editor, and was the first woman to achieve status as the head editor.

Yemedish is known as a supporter of many poets in Ethiopia, and is involved in showcasing both her own work and the work of others at poem-a-thons in Addis Ababa.

Since retiring from Polis Ena Ermijaw, Yemodish writes and participates in organisations devoted to women's rights.  She is the current President of the Ethiopian Women Writers’ Association and the chair of the board of the Network for Ethiopian Women's Associations.

Bibliography 
 Abyotawi Gitmoch (‘Revolutionary Poems’) published in 1979 (12 poems in an illustrated collection)
 Ye Bakene Gize  (‘Wasted Time’) published in 1990
 Yalfera fre (‘Fruit without fruit’) published in 1998
 Eta (‘Luck’) – a collection of short stories by nine women authors about women.
 Ebdwa Beletech (‘Mud is Better’) a novella
 Yaltenabebu Liboch (‘Unread Hearts’) a collection of short stories by nine women authors, which was published by Population Media Center as the winning selections in a competition among 42 women authors
 Fiker Yetamacho Nefsoch (‘Life Wants Love’) a crime novel
 Waginos (‘Healing Medicine’) a collection of poems
 Yewarda ser Gubae (‘Meeting under a Great Tree’) a collection of short stories by several authors
 Enya 2 (We 2) a collection of poems by several women
 Yenay Alem (‘My World’) a collection of true stories by several authors who won a competition
 Azurit (‘Turbulence’) a collection of true stories by several authors who won a competition sponsored by the Population Media Center (2012)
 Nawazhu Mehur (‘Educated but crazy’), a novel based on a true story (2012)

References 

Living people
1960 births
Ethiopian women writers
Ethiopian poets
Ethiopian women poets
Ethiopian writers
Crime journalists
Women crime writers
Ethiopian women's rights activists
20th-century Ethiopian writers
21st-century Ethiopian writers
20th-century Ethiopian women
21st-century Ethiopian women